William John Gruffydd (1916 – 21 April 2011), better known by his bardic name of Elerydd, was a Welsh Baptist minister and poet who served as Archdruid of the National Eisteddfod of Wales between 1984 and 1987.

Like all Archdruids, Elerydd was himself the winner of a major prize at the National Eisteddfod, in his case the crown at the Pwllheli Eisteddfod in 1955 and at Cardiff in 1960.

Works

Poetry
Ffenestri (1961)
Cerddi'r Llygad (1973)

Autobiography
Meddylu (1986)
O Ffair Rhos i'r Maen Llog (2003)

Other
Folklore and myth (1964)
Tua Soar (1994–97) Capel Soar y Mynydd, Ceredigion.

References

1916 births
Crowned bards
2011 deaths
Welsh-language writers
Welsh male poets
20th-century Welsh Baptist ministers
Welsh Eisteddfod archdruids
Welsh Eisteddfod winners
20th-century Welsh poets
20th-century British male writers
20th-century British writers